Phước Long may refer to several places in Vietnam, including:

Phước Long, Bình Phước, a district-level town ( of Bình Phước province
Phước Long District, Bạc Liêu, a rural district of Bạc Liêu province
Phước Long, Khánh Hòa, a ward of Nha Trang
Phước Long (township), a township and capital of Phước Long district
Phước Long, Bến Tre, a commune of Giồng Trôm district
Phước Long (commune in Bạc Liêu), a commune of Phước Long district

See also
Battle of Phuoc Long, decisive battle of the Vietnam War
Former Phước Long province in South Vietnam, now part of Bình Phước province
Long Phước (disambiguation)